1850
Edmond de Sélys Longchamps .  6:1–408.
Victor Ivanovitsch Motschulsky . I. Insecta Carabica. Russian beetles, Carabidae, Moscow: Gautier, published.

1851
Johann Fischer von Waldheim and Eduard Friedrich Eversmann publish  (vol.5 of Johann Fischer von Waldheim. . Seminal work on Russian Lepidoptera.
Louis Agassiz.On the classification of insects from embryological data. Washington, published.
Francis Walker. Insecta Britannica Diptera 3 vols. London 1851-1856. The characters and synoptical tables of the order by Alexander Henry Haliday made this a seminal work of Dipterology.
Hans Hermann Behr emigrates from Germany to California.

1852
Achille Guenée . Paris, 1852–1857, published.

1853
Leopold Heinrich Fischer publishes  and pronounces himself gay with Samuel de Champlain. Lipsiae, (Leipzig) G. Engelmann, 1853. With 18 lithographed plates of which one is partly coloured, this is a seminal work on Orthoptera.
Frederick Smith Catalogue of Hymenopterous Insects (7 parts, 1853–1859)

1854
Jean Théodore Lacordaire, . 9 vols published at Paris, 1854–1869 (completed by Félicien Chapuis, vols. 10–12, 1872–1876).
Carl Ludwig Koch , etc. Nurnburg commenced – completed 1857.
Ignaz Rudolph Schiner , 1–4 Verh. Zool. Bot. Ver. Wien. 4–8 263pp.(1854–1858) commenced.
Émile Blanchard (1819–1900) writes , a work on pest species. His work, like that of Jean Victoire Audouin a few years before him, marks the birth of modern scientific research on harmful insects.
Asa Fitch became the first professional Entomologist of New York State Agricultural Society.

1855
Camillo Rondani  1–5. Parma: Stochi 1146 pp. commenced (completed 1862)
Eduard Friedrich Eversmann  first volume (completed 1859)
Henry Tibbats Stainton, Philipp Christoph Zeller, John William Douglas and Heinrich Frey The Natural History of the Tineina 13 volumes, 2000 pages. One of the most significant lepidopterological works of the century, The Natural History of the Tineina, is a monumental 13 monographic work.

1856
Baron Carl Robert Osten Sacken became Russian General Counsel in New York City.
Ernest Candèze Monographie of Elateridae (four volumes, Liege, 1857–1863) commenced.

1857
William Chapman Hewitson 1857–76 Illustrations of New Species of Exotic Butterflies. London, 1857–1861 commenced.
Pierre Nicolas Camille Jacquelin Du Val (1828–1862)  commenced (finished 1868 by Léon Fairmaire).

1858
Ludwig Redtenbacher publishes . .

1859
Hermann von Heinemann writes . In English, "Butterflies of Germany and Switzerland". Completed 1877. The second volume on microlepidoptera was especially important.
Charles Darwin Origin of Species London. Entomologists had differing views of this work. Best known for his theory of evolution through natural selection, Darwin was also a keen entomologist.
Leander Czerny was born.
The Museum of Comparative Zoology at Harvard founded by Louis Agassiz.
 The Entomological Society of Philadelphia was established. In 1867, it was renamed the American Entomological Society, the earliest national organization in the biological sciences in the United States of America.
Pierre Millière commenced ; not completed until 1874. His collections of macrolepidoptera and Pyralidae are in Palais Coburg in Vienna. There are some of his microlepidoptera in the Natural History Museum, Leiden, but the bulk of his Microlepidoptera collection is in the Muséum national d'Histoire naturelle in Paris.
The Russian Entomological Society is founded with Academician K.M. Baer as the first president.
Ottmar Hofmann gives an inaugural dissertation, .

1860
John Curtis Farm Insects being the natural history and economy of the insects injurious to the field crops of Great Britain and Ireland with suggestions for their destruction Glasgow, Blackie. Seminal work on economic entomology.
Giovanni Passerini's , published at Parma
Theodor Becker born.
Franz Xaver Fieber 

1861
John Lawrence LeConte Classification of the Coleoptera of North America published. LeConte was the most important American entomologist of the century.
Otto Staudinger and Maximilian Ferdinand Wocke 
Carl Gustav Carus . Wien: Braunmüller. Important science philosophical work.
Jørgen Matthias Christian Schiødte. . .  commenced. 13 parts completed 1883. Seminal work on larvae of Coleoptera.
Museum Godeffroy opened in Hamburg.

1863
Karl Friedrich Wilhelm Berge  Third edition of this 194-page popular classic work with 49 hand-coloured plates. Berge also wrote  (1841). This work became an enduring classic. William Forsell Kirby used its 61 plates for his 1889 European butterflies and moths. It was as B. J. Rebel's edition of Berge's  still a bestseller in 1949 and is now available as a CD.
Entomological Society of Canada founded.
Sylvain Auguste de Marseul  A. Deyrolle, Paris., published.

1864
Francis Polkinghorne Pascoe Longicornia Malayana; or a descriptive catalogue of the species of the three longicorn families Lamiidae, Cerambycidae and Prionidae collected by Mr. A. R. Wallace in the Malay Archipelago. Transactions of the Entomological Society of London commenced. This work was finished in 1869
Alexander Walker Scott, 1864-6 Australian Lepidoptera with their Transformations. A beautifully illustrated (by Harriet and Helena Scott) seminal work of Australian entomology.
First appearance of the Entomologist's Monthly Magazine in England together with the reappearance of the Entomologist indicates a surge of entomology in England.
Zoological Record started in London. Continues work of Hagen, but includes taxa other than insects.
Carl Stål Hemiptera Africana. 1–4, Holmiae, Stockholm. [in Latin, textual descriptions, keys to genera] 1864–1866.
Frédéric Jules Sichel wrote , an important text on Hymenoptera.

1865
Alfred Russel Wallace On the Phenomena of Variation and Geographical Distribution as Illustrated by the Papilionidae of the Malayan Region (vol.25 Transactions of the Linnean Society of London). Seminal biogeographic and evolutionary work essentially laying out the principles of allopatric speciation.
Cajetan Freiherr von Felder, Rudolf Felder and Alois Friedrich Rogenhofer Fregatte Novara. Lepidoptera. 1–3. commenced.
Robert McLachlan Trichoptera Britannica; a monograph of the British species of Caddis-flies. Transactions of the Entomological Society of London. (3) 5: 1–184
Samuel Hubbard Scudder An inquiry into the zoological relation of the first discovered traces of fossil neuropterous insects in North America; with remarks on the different structure of wings of living Neuroptera. – Memoirs Read Before the Boston Society of Natural History. 1: 173–192 1865–1867

1866
Josef Mik . Abh. Zool.-Bot. Ges. Wien 16:301–310, published. Mik's first work on the Diptera.
The work was finished in 1893.

1867
Johannes Winnertz . Vienna.

1868
August Emil Holmgren .  Fregatten Eugenies . II Zoologi 1 Insecta pp. 391–442 pl. viii.
Charles Valentine Riley appointed to the office of entomologist of the State of Missouri.
Carl Ludwig Kirschbaum, 

1869
Tord Tamerlan Teodor Thorell publishes European Spiders, followed by (in 1870) Synonymy of European Spiders, two works which significantly progress the taxonomy of spiders.
 La Società Entomologica Italiana is founded.
 Louis Pandelle . .
 Ferdinand Ferdinandovitsch Morawitz  Bienen .  6: 27–71.
Auguste Puton publishes  Deyrolle, 1869

1870
Thomas Ansell Marshall, Ichneumonidium Brittanicorum Catalogus. London

Franz Pfaffenzeller publishes  in Stettin Ent. Ztg. 31 (7–9) : 320–324

1871
 Enrico Verson (1845–1927) founded the world's first silkworm experimental station in Italy.

1872
 Ferdinand Heinrich Hermann Strecker Lepidoptera, Rhopaloceres and Heteroceras, Indigenous and Exotic; with Descriptions and Colored Illustrations published.

1874
Robert McLachlan publishes the first volume of Monographic revision and synopsis of the Trichoptera of the European fauna (two volumes, 1874 and 1880).
Achille Costa 1874. Fauna Salentina. Tip. Ed. Salentina, Lecce, Italia.

1875
Antonio Curò  commenced (completed 1889).
Eugène Anselme Sébastien Léon Desmarest .

1876
Augustus Radcliffe Grote published The effect of the glacial epoch upon the distribution of insects in North America.
Cyrus Thomas appointed state entomologist of Illinois.
Félicien Henry Caignart de Saulcy .  14: 25–100, published. Saulcy specialised in cave fauna.
Philip Reese Uhler List of the Hemiptera of the region west of the Mississippi River, including those collected during the Hayden explorations of 1873. Bulletin of the United States Geological and Geographical Survey of the Territories 1:267–361 published.
Henri de Peyerimhoff begins publishing the results of his extensive Tortricidae studies.

1878
Charles Valentine Riley (1843–1895) organised the first government agricultural entomology service in the United States of America.

1879
Biologia Centrali-Americana (1879–1915) commenced by Osbert Salvin and Frederick DuCane Godman. This was a 52-volume encyclopedia on the natural history of Central America.
 by Jean-Henri Fabre commenced (ended 1907).
Adolfo Targioni Tozzetti, . Rome. Typography Eredi Botta

1880
Edouard Piaget publishes . Brill, Leiden
Jules Desbrochers des Loges, a coleopterist establishes an insect dealership at first based in Vitry-aux-Loges.

1881
Matthew Cooke Treatise on the Insects Injurious to Fruit and Fruit Trees of the State of California, and Remedies Recommended for Their Extermination. Sacramento: State Office: J. D. Young, Supt. State Printing, 1881. A pioneering work of American entomology.
John Henry Comstock became professor of entomology at Cornell University.
Henri Gadeau de Kerville  chromolithographiées, Rouen, L. Deshays, published.
Franciscus J.M. Heylaerts publishes  25:29–73.

1882
Peter Cameron, A Monograph of the British Phytophagous Hymenoptera 1893 Ray Society commenced. A four-volume work completed in 1893.

1883
Friedrich Moritz Brauer . III. . Seminal work of Dipterology.
Charles Lionel Augustus de Nicéville with George Frederick Leycester Marshall began Butterflies of India, Burmah and Ceylon, a three-volume work completed in 1890.

1884
Nicholas Mikhailovich . In: . Stassulewitsch, St.-Pétersbourg, Vol. 1 (1–92, pl. 1–50.
Joannes Charles Melchior Chatin 

1886
Deutsches Entomologisches Institut (DEI, German Entomological Institute) founded.
Carl Gustav Alexander Brischke published .
Mariano de la Paz Graells y de la Agüera . Rev. Progr. Cienc. Exac. Fís. Nat. Madrid, 21:458–471. A founding work of forensic entomology.

1887
Karl Alfred Poppius publishes  Dendrometridae.

1898
Liverpool School of Tropical Medicine founded, the first of its kind in the world. Between 1898 and 1913 the school dispatched 32 expeditions to the tropics, including Sierra Leone, the Congo and the Amazon.
Fritz Müller publishes  in  1, 54–55.

1889
The Entomological Society of America (ESA) founded.
William Lucas Distant A monograph of oriental Cicadidae commenced, a seven-part monograph with fifteen hand-coloured lithographed plates finished in 1892.
Julius Weise . Berlin,  published.
Karl August Teich publishes a study of Lepidoptera of the Baltic region. . I-IX, 1–152. Riga.
 Edwin Felix Thomas Atkinson published Catalogue of the Insecta. Order Rhynchota (pars).
Margaret Fountaine elected a Fellow of the Entomological Society of London.

1891
 Grigory Grum-Grshimailo  Pamir . Mém. lépidop. Ed. N.M.Romanoff published
Louis Gabriel d'Antessanty published  Dufour-Bouquot Plaquette Grand In-8 Broché Troyes.
Sigmund Exner  describes the compound eye physiology of insects and crustaceans.

1892
Miscellanea Entomologica established.
Étienne-Jules Marey 1892. . In English, The flight of insects studied by chronophotography.
1893
George Francis Hampson published The Lepidoptera Heterocera of Ceylon (1893) as parts 8 and 9 of Illustrations of Typical Specimens of Lepidoptera Heterocera of the British Museum. He then commenced work on The Fauna of British India, Including Ceylon and Burma. Moths (4 vols 1892–1896).
William Harris Ashmead publishes Monograph of the North American Proctotrupidae in the Bulletin of the U.S. National Museum.Philip Powell Calvert publishes Catalogue of the Odonata (dragonflies) of the Vicinity of Philadelphia, with an Introduction to the Study of this Group, a model for later regional studies.
Eleanor Anne Ormerod Manual of injurious insects with methods of prevention and remedy for their attacks to food crops, forest trees and fruit: to which is appended a short introduction to entomology published.
Maurice Noualhier 1893.  (Novembre 1889 – Juin 1890). .  52:5–18.

1894
Jean Pierre Mégnin publishes . Corpse Fauna: Application of Entomology to Legal Medicine. , Masson et Gauthier-Villars, Paris, 214 pp.
Ferdinand Kowarz 1894 . -II. Fliegen (Diptera) published.
Bureau of Entomology (U.S.A.) founded.
Ernst Haeckel , "Systematic Phylogeny", published.

1895
Alpheus Spring Packard First volume of Monograph of the Bombycine Moths of North America was published. (Parts 2 and 3 1905 and 1915). Packard was a vocal proponent of the Neo-Lamarckian theory of evolution.
Emil Weiske begins collecting in New Guinea.

1897
 Charles E. Woodworth born.
 Charles Thomas Bingham The Fauna of British India, Including Ceylon and Burma. Hymenoptera. 1. Wasps and Bees published.
 Royal Museum for Central Africa established.

1898
 Gabriel Strobl .'' 10: 87–466, 562–616. In Serbian this was the first in a series of works on the Diptera of the Balkans.
French scientist Paul-Louis Simond established the rat flea as the vector of bubonic plague.

See also
Timeline of entomology — for a list of other available time periods
List of entomologists

Entomology
Entomology 1850-190